Propel is a free, open-source (MIT) object–relational mapping toolkit written in PHP. It is also an integral part of the PHP framework Symfony and was the default ORM up to, and including version 1.2.

History 

The Propel project was started in August 2003, with the availability of beta versions PHP version 5.  With version 5, PHP was finally able to provide a level of support for object-oriented programming that both made projects like Propel possible and also created a demand for these hitherto-missing components of large-scale, object-oriented architectures.  Propel was originally based on the Apache Torque project, which was a Java language ORM project.

Features 

Propel's primary function is to provide a mapping between PHP classes and database tables.  To accomplish this Propel includes a generator component which uses source code generation to build PHP classes based on a datamodel definition written in XML.  Propel also includes a runtime component which manages connections, transactions, and any idiosyncratic rules that describe the workings of the RDBMS being used with Propel.

See also

 List of object–relational mapping software
 Doctrine (PHP)
 Symfony, a web application framework
 Skipper, a visualization tool for Propel

References

External links 

Propel Home Page
Symfony Framework - Databases and Propel

Free software programmed in PHP
PHP libraries
Object-relational mapping